Chelapur is a village and gram panchayat in Chandpur tehsil, Bijnor District, in the Indian state of Uttar Pradesh.

Demographics
As of census 2001, Chelapur had a population of 644. Males are 354, and females are 290.
The location code or village code of Chelapur village is 114473. There are about 121 houses in Chelapur village.

Location

The post office serving the village lies in the nearby village of Nangli Pathwari and the designated police station is in Noorpur, the nearest town, which is around  distant.

Education
Chelapur village has higher literacy rate compared to Uttar Pradesh. In 2011, literacy rate of Chelapur village was 71.58% compared to 67.68% of Uttar Pradesh. In Chelapur Male literacy stands at 81.76% while female literacy rate was 60.00%. Yogesh Vikal, one of the village resident is a writer on wiki how and wikipedia and also an Engineer in computer science.

There is only one primary school in the village, therefore the parents send their children to nearby towns and cities like Noorpur, Dhampur.

Culture
There is an old holy Peepal tree in the village commonly known as 'Dada Devta'. Nearby this holy tree a Shiv Temple is also present. The people of village are aware of importance of education and send their children to nearby schools in town.
Some of the villages near Chelapur are Gohawar, Askaripur, Abdullapur Dahana, Doondhli, Saidpur Mafi, Nangla and others.

Political and social environment
The village forms a part of the Noorpur Vidhan Sabha constituency.

References

Yogesh Vikal योगेश विकल writer
जाम लगाने पर 80 के खिलाफ रिपोर्ट - Amar Ujala, Sunday 30 September 2012
- बेटा चला गया, सम्मान भी नहीं मिला - Amar Ujala
 तीन की हत्या कर सरिये से लदा ट्रक लूटा - Desh Localnews — LiveHindustan.com

चेलापुर में किसान के घर डाका 2016

 Shree Kuber Filling Station Chelapur श्री कुबेर फिलिंग स्टेशन चेलापुर

Villages in Bijnor district